Sunset Station is a hotel and locals casino in Henderson, Nevada. It is owned and operated by Station Casinos on a  site on Sunset Road near Interstate 515, across from the Galleria at Sunset shopping center.

The resort includes a 21-story hotel tower with 448 rooms,  of meeting space, slot machines, table games, a 13-screen movie theater, a 542-seat bingo hall, a 72-lane bowling alley open 24 hours a day, a 5,000-seat outdoor amphitheater and nine restaurants.

Features

Gaudí Bar
The central feature of the 140-seat Gaudí Bar is a  stained glass ceiling composed of thousands of glass pieces and weighing 12 tons. The design of the Gaudí Bar is said to have been inspired by Spanish architect Antoni Gaudí.

Strike Zone Bowling Center
Sunset Station's Strike Zone Bowling Center opened in April 2005. In 2007, the alley hosted the PBA Tour's Motel 6 Classic.

History
Sunset Station opened on June 10, 1997. While Station Casinos had successful openings with Boulder Station and Texas Station in the mid-1990s, Sunset Station was considered a demonstration of the company's ability to develop and market a locals casino that was upscale. Following the success of Sunset Station, Station Casinos continued to open locals casinos that were more upscale, such as Green Valley Ranch (2001) and Red Rock Resort (2006).

On June 14, 2019, employees voted in favor to unionize the property by 83% as these vote margins are no longer disclosed to the public. It was organized by the Bartenders Union and the Culinary Workers Union and supervised by the National Labor Relations Board (NLRB) under the Trump administration. It is the sixth Station Casinos property to be unionized.

Expansions

In 1999, Sunset Station underwent a $34 million expansion project that included a new parking structure, increased casino floor and meeting space and the Sonoma Cellar Restaurant.

In 2005, a multimillion-dollar expansion added The Strike Zone Bowling Center as well as additional gaming space.

References

External links

 

1997 establishments in Nevada
Buildings and structures in Henderson, Nevada
Casino hotels
Casinos in the Las Vegas Valley
Hotel buildings completed in 1997
Hotels established in 1997
Companies that filed for Chapter 11 bankruptcy in 2009
Resorts in the Las Vegas Valley
Skyscraper hotels in the Las Vegas Valley
Station Casinos